Pali is a village in West Godavari district in the state of Andhra Pradesh in India.

Demographics
 India census, Pali has a population of 2628 of which 1305 are males while 1323 are females. The average sex ratio of Pali village is 1014. The child population is 244, which makes up 9.28% of the total population of the village, with sex ratio 1000. In 2011, the literacy rate of Pali village was 84.56% when compared to 67.02% of Andhra Pradesh.

See also 
 Eluru

References 

Villages in West Godavari district